Missa pro populo (Latin: "Mass for the people") is a term used in liturgical texts and rules of the Catholic Church. It refers to the requirement of all ordained pastors to say Mass for the people of their parish. This is as opposed to a Mass said for a particular person, for the benefit of the celebrant alone, or for the benefit of the dead (see Requiem Mass). This requirement is often linked to the term parochial Mass, referring to the Mass said in the parochial or parish church.

Mass for the parish
The parish is established to provide the parishioners with the helps of religion, especially with Mass. The parochial Mass is celebrated for their welfare on all Sundays and holy days of obligation, even when suppressed. The parish priest is not obliged to say it personally; but if he does not, he must offer his own Mass for that intention. Parishioners now fulfil their duty by assisting at Mass in any church; but formerly they had at least to hear a Mass in the parish church. This obligation fell into disuse owing to the privileges granted to the religious orders; the Council of Trent, treats it only as a counsel; and notwithstanding certain provincial and diocesan regulations of the 16th and 17th centuries, the obligation ceased.

The parochial Mass pre-Vatican II
The Mass not being strictly conventual, it was not obligatory by common law for it to be sung as a missa cantata, but it could be, and frequently was, being prescribed by the statutes or custom of the area. It was preceded generally by the blessing and aspersion of water on Sundays. Even if the Mass was not sung, it was celebrated with additional solemnity, with more than two candles on the altar and at least two servers. What was characteristic of it is the instruction, with its special prayers, the announcements made to the congregation, the publication of banns of marriage, and finally the familiar sermon or homily. These later two features, so common today, were features only made an obligation at the Masses of Sundays and Holy-days relatively recently in the long history of the Mass.

The current Mass
Currently the parochial Mass, or missa pro populo is still a requirement for all pastors who have taken possession of their parish. A pastor (parish priest) who has the care of several parishes is obliged to apply only one Mass for all the people entrusted to him.
In terms of solemnity, while it is stipulated in various clerical manuals that Solemn Masses will have six altar candles (seven for a Pontifical Mass) the number of altar candles lit is highly variable. Generally at least two are used. The number of servers is also relatively variable, as is the inclusion of an optional crucifer or cross-bearer..

References

Latin religious words and phrases